NGC 5668 is a nearly face-on spiral galaxy, visual magnitude about 11.5, located about 81 million light years away in the constellation Virgo. It was discovered in 1786 by William Herschel. It is a member of the NGC 5638 Group of galaxies, itself one of the Virgo III Groups strung out to the east of the Virgo Supercluster of galaxies. 

As seen from the Earth, it is inclined by an angle of 18° to the line of sight along a position angle of 145°. The morphological classification in the De Vaucouleurs system is SA(s)d, indicating a pure spiral structure with loosely wound arms. However, optical images of the galaxy indicate the presence of a weak bar structure spanning an angle of 12″ across the nucleus.

Three supernovae have been observed in this galaxy: SN 1952G, SN 1954B, and SN 2004G. The last, a type II supernova, was initially imaged on January 19, 2004, at 43" to the west and 12".5 south of the galaxy core. High velocity clouds of neutral hydrogen have been observed in NGC 5668, which may have their origin in supernova explosions and strong stellar winds.

Gallery

References

External links
 

Virgo (constellation)
Unbarred spiral galaxies
5668
09363